Jacco Eltingh and Paul Haarhuis were the defending champions but lost in the semifinals to Byron Black and Grant Connell.

Black and Connell won in the final 6–1, 7–5 against Yevgeny Kafelnikov and Daniel Vacek.

Seeds
Champion seeds are indicated in bold text while text in italics indicates the round in which those seeds were eliminated.

  Yevgeny Kafelnikov /  Daniel Vacek (final)
  Byron Black /  Grant Connell (champions)
  Jacco Eltingh /  Paul Haarhuis (semifinals)
  Libor Pimek /  Byron Talbot (first round)

Draw

References
 1996 Gerry Weber Open Doubles Draw

1996 Gerry Weber Open